Route 121 is a short highway in northwestern Missouri. It begins at U.S. Route 69 (US 69) south of Cameron, where it begins travelling eastward. The road intersects a county route and crosses over two streams. The route ends at the Wallace State Park entrance, where the road becomes Route HH after the intersection. The route was opened around 1936, serving as the connector between US 69 and the state park. The road cost $18,000 to build in 1935, and it allowed federal construction to begin at the park.

Route description

All of the route is located in Clinton County. Route 121 begins at a T-intersection at US 69, south of Cameron and US 69's interchange with Interstate 35 near the city. The route travels eastwards over Christman Brook, and it enters a mixture of farmland and forests. Route 121 shifts north temporarily, and it intersects Northeast Jones Road, the end of the concurrency. The road then borders Hawn State Park and crosses over Deer Creek. Travelling through a forest, the route turns southeastward near the park entrance. Route 121 ends at a Y-intersection with the park entrance and Route HH, a supplemental route. The road continues eastward as Route HH, which ends at Route 13 in Kingston.

Route 121 is designated as a major collector route by the Missouri Department of Transportation (MoDot). In 2016, MoDOT calculated 627 vehicles, including 32 trucks travelling on Route 121 east of US 69. This is expressed in terms of annual average daily traffic (AADT), a measure of traffic volume for any average day of the year. Although the route travels in an east–west fashion, MoDot has designated it as a north–south route.

History
In October 1935, the Missouri State Highway Commission announced a project to construct Route 121AP from US 69 to Wallace State Park. The project included grading of the route, culverts, bridges, and gravel pavement. Gerard Knutson of Kansas City received the contract for the project, with the lowest bid of $20,614. Approval of the project was given by Franklin D. Roosevelt by October 31, with a new price of $18,000. Construction started on November 25, by the Joe Pohl Construction Company. Workers were employed one week before construction, allocated to building the bridge near the park. The project allowed federal work to start for the park, and the finished road was reflected in the 1936 state map as Route 121. The route was paved in asphalt by 1949.

Major intersections

References

External links

Wallace State Park

121
Transportation in Clinton County, Missouri